The Ivor Novello Award for Best Song Musically and Lyrically is one of the awards presented annually by the Ivors Academy at the Ivor Novello Awards to recognize the best in songwriting and composing talents from the United Kingdom and Ireland. The award was first presented in 1968, with John Lennon and Paul McCartney being the first recipients for the song "She's Leaving Home", performed by The Beatles. The award goes to the writers of the song, not the performers unless they share songwriting credits.

Recipients

1960s

1970s

1980s

1990s

2000s

2010s

2020s

References

External links
 Oficial awards website
 Ivor Awards archive